San Andrés de Sotavento is a town and municipality located in the Córdoba Department, northern Colombia.

References

 Gobernacion de Cordoba - San Andrés de Sotavento

Municipalities of Córdoba Department